Svenstrup railway station is a railway station serving the railway town of Svenstrup in Himmerland south of Aalborg, Denmark.

Svenstrup station is located on the Randers-Aalborg Line from Randers to Aalborg and is part of the Aalborg Commuter Rail service. It opened in 1872, closed in 1972, and reopened in 2003. The train services are currently operated by the railway companies DSB and Nordjyske Jernbaner.

History 
The original station opened in 1872. In 1899, Svendstrup Station also became the terminus of the new Aars-Nibe-Svendstrup railway line. From 1902, however, all trains on the Aars-Nibe-Svenstrup railway line were continued from Svenstrup to Aalborg station using the tracks of the Randers–Aalborg line. The Aars-Nibe-Svenstrup line was extended to Hvalpsund in 1910. The Aalborg-Hvalpsund Line was closed in 1969. Svendstrup station was closed in 1972 during a series of station closures in the 1970s. It reopened in 2003 as a part of the new Aalborg Commuter Rail service.

Operations 
The train services are operated by DSB and Nordjyske Jernbaner. The station offers direct InterCity services to Copenhagen and Aalborg, operated by DSB, and commuter train services to Skørping and Aalborg, operated by Nordjyske Jernbaner.

References

Bibliography

External links

 Banedanmark – government agency responsible for maintenance and traffic control of most of the Danish railway network
 DSB – largest Danish train operating company
 Nordjyske Jernbaner – Danish railway company operating in North Jutland Region
 Danske Jernbaner – website with information on railway history in Denmark
 Nordjyllands Jernbaner – website with information on railway history in North Jutland

Railway stations in the North Jutland Region
Railway stations opened in 1872
Railway stations closed in 1972
Railway stations opened in 2003
Railway stations in Denmark opened in the 21st century